Dražen Anđušić (born 19 January 1993) is a Montenegrin football midfielder who plays for FK Jezero.

Club career
He played with FK BSK Borča in the Serbian SuperLiga and during the winter break of the 2013–14 season he returned to Montenegro and signed with Montenegrin First League side FK Mladost Podgorica.

References

1993 births
Living people
Footballers from Podgorica
Association football midfielders
Montenegrin footballers
FK BSK Borča players
OFK Titograd players
FK Dečić players
FK Jezero players
Montenegrin First League players
Serbian SuperLiga players
Montenegrin Second League players
Montenegrin expatriate footballers
Expatriate footballers in Serbia
Montenegrin expatriate sportspeople in Serbia